The 2022 Texas Attorney General election took place on November 8, 2022 to elect the Attorney General of Texas. Incumbent Republican Attorney General Ken Paxton won re-election to his third term.

Republican primary

Candidates

Nominee
Ken Paxton, incumbent attorney general

Eliminated in runoff
George P. Bush, commissioner of the Texas General Land Office

Eliminated in primary 
Eva Guzman, former Associate Justice of the Supreme Court of Texas (2009–2021)

Withdrawn
Matt Krause, state representative from the 93rd district (running for Tarrant County district attorney; endorsed Gohmert)

Endorsements

First round

Polling

Graphical summary

Results

Gohmert performed best in Texas's 1st congressional district, where he serves as a US representative, Guzman performed best in urban Travis, Harris, and Dallas counties, Bush performed best in the Rio Grande Valley, and Paxton performed best in the Texas Panhandle, South Plains, and Southeast Texas.

Runoff

Polling

Results

Democratic primary

Candidates

Nominee
Rochelle Mercedes Garza, former attorney for the American Civil Liberties Union

Eliminated in runoff

Joe Jaworski, attorney, mediator, former mayor of Galveston, and grandson of former U.S. Department of Justice special counsel Leon Jaworski

Eliminated in primary
Mike Fields, attorney and former judge of the Harris County Criminal Court at Law No. 14 (endorsed Garza in runoff)
Lee Merritt, civil rights attorney (endorsed Garza in runoff)
S. T-Bone Raynor, attorney

Declined
Justin Nelson, nominee for Texas Attorney General in 2018

Endorsements

First round

Polling

Graphical summary

Results

Runoff

Polling

Results

Libertarian convention

Declared
Mark Ash, attorney and candidate for Chief Justice of the Supreme Court of Texas in 2020

General election 
On October 27, 2022, Libertarian nominee Mark Ash published an op-ed in The Amarillo Pioneer in which he blasted Ken Paxton as "the poster child for corruption and authoritarianism" and recommended that if voters were "reluctant to throw away their votes on a third-party candidate," they should vote for Democratic nominee Rochelle Garza instead. The Texas Democratic Party put out a statement claiming that Ash had endorsed Garza, but Ash clarified that he was not endorsing her, nor would he be dropping out of the race.

Predictions

Polling
Graphical summary

George P. Bush vs. Rochelle Garza

George P. Bush vs. Joe Jaworski

Ken Paxton vs. Joe Jaworski

Ken Paxton vs. Justin Nelson

Results

Notes

Partisan clients

See also
 2022 United States attorney general elections

References

External links
Official campaign websites
 Rochelle Garza (D) for Attorney General
 Ken Paxton (R) for Attorney General

Attorney General
Texas
Texas Attorney General elections